Rajendra Anantrai Shukla (born 12 October 1942) is a Gujarati poet. He taught at various places before voluntarily retiring. He published several poetry collections which won him several major Gujarati literary awards.

Life

He was born on 12 October 1942 in Bantwa village near Junagadh, Gujarat, India. His family is native of Wadhwan. He completed his primary education from Jamnagar, Bhavnagar, Bantwa and Majevadi. He completed his secondary education from Junagadh and Ahmedabad. He started his college education from Bahauddin College, Junagadh. He completed B. A. in 1965 in Sanskrit and Prakrit from L. D. Arts College, Ahmedabad and M. A. in the same subjects in 1967 from School of Languages, Gujarat University. He taught at various institutions until 1982.

Shukla is married to Nayana Jani, a Gujarati poet. After teaching Sanskrit at Dahod, he left teaching voluntarily in 1982 to educate his children without schooling as an experiment. He resides in Ahmedabad.

Works

He studied poetry from Takhtasinhji Parmar along with Manoj Khanderia and Shyam Sadhu.

He is influenced by the poetry of Narasinh Mehta, a saint-poet of medieval Gujarat as well as modernist poetry of Re Math poets. His first poem was published in Kumar magazine in 1962. He has published several poetry collections: Komal Rishabh (1970), Antar Gandhar (1981) and five volumes of Gazal Samhita (2005). Swavachakni Shodh (1972) is his long poem.

Recognition
Shukla was awarded by the Government of Gujarat for the best anthology of poetry of 1970 for Komal Rishabh which he shared with poet Ramesh Parekh. He was again awarded by the Government of Gujarat for the best anthology of poetry of 1981 for Antar Gandhar. He was also awarded Kavi Nhanalal Prize in 1981 and Uma-Snehrashmi Prize, 1980–1981 for Antar Gandhar. He is a recipient of Gujarat Sahitya Academy Award for Ghazal Samhita as the Best Anthology of Gujarati poetry in 2005. He also received the Narsinh Mehta Award, the highest award being given to contemporary poet in 2006. He was awarded Sanskar Chandrak in 1980 and Ranjitram Suvarna Chandrak in 2006. He also received Sahitya Academy Award for Ghazal Samhita in 2007. He also received Narmad Suvarna Chandrak in 2008, Vali Gujarati Gazal Award in 2009, Lekharatna award and Kalapi Award in 2001.

References

External links

1942 births
Gujarati-language poets
Living people
Recipients of the Sahitya Akademi Award in Gujarati
People from Junagadh
Gujarat University alumni
Recipients of the Ranjitram Suvarna Chandrak